In Inuit mythology, Idliragijenget is the god of the ocean.

References 

Inuit goddesses
Sea and river goddesses
Underworld goddesses